"Say Wonderful Things" is a popular song with music by Philip Green and lyrics by Norman Newell, published in 1963. It was the 's entry in the Eurovision Song Contest 1963, held in London. The singer was Ronnie Carroll, who also represented the UK the year before. The song finished fourth behind Denmark, Switzerland and Italy; eventually reaching No. 6 in the UK Singles Chart.

The most popular version of the song in the United States was recorded by Patti Page, as the title song of her first album for Columbia Records. Page's record peaked only at No. 81 on the Billboard Hot 100, but was more successful in Australia, continental Europe and in Asian territories such as Hong Kong and Japan.

References

Eurovision songs of the United Kingdom
Eurovision songs of 1963
Songs with lyrics by Norman Newell
1963 singles
Philips Records singles
Patti Page songs
1963 songs